The Saxon River is a river of the Tasman Region of New Zealand's South Island. It flows northwest to reach the Big River 10 kilometres southeast off Kahurangi Point. The Saxon river's entire length is within Kahurangi National Park.

See also
List of rivers of New Zealand

References

Rivers of the Tasman District
Kahurangi National Park
Rivers of New Zealand